Émilie Évesque (born 23 September 1988) is a French sports shooter. She competed in the Women's 10 metre air rifle and the women's 50 m three positions events at the 2012 Summer Olympics.

References

External links
 
 
 

1988 births
Living people
French female sport shooters
Olympic shooters of France
Shooters at the 2012 Summer Olympics
Sportspeople from Montpellier
Mediterranean Games bronze medalists for France
Mediterranean Games medalists in shooting
Competitors at the 2013 Mediterranean Games
21st-century French women